d'Estaing is a French surname. Notable people with the surname include:

 Charles Henri Hector d'Estaing (1729–1794), French general and admiral
 Guillaume-Hugues d'Estaing (died 1455), French Roman Catholic cardinal and bishop

See also

d'Estaing family
Estaing (disambiguation)